Rita Ostrovskaya (Ukrainian: Рита Островська; born 1953) is a Ukrainian photographer, living in Kassel, Germany. Her work has contributed to the preservation of traces of Jewish culture in Ukraine. Ostrovskaya's work is held in the collection of the San Francisco Museum of Modern Art.

Work
Ostrovskaya was born in Kyiv.  She studied cinematography and journalism in Leningrad.

Her large-scale project Jews in the Ukraine contains a series of photographs of typical Jewish towns—shtetl—in Ukraine, and the lives of Jews living in them. It was made between 1989 and 2001, beginning with Shargorod, at a time of significant change. Her accompanying text describes Jewish customs and cultural rituals that were being practiced.

Since 2001, she has been living and working in Kassel, Germany. She is also a ceramicist.

Publications
Jews in the Ukraine. With photographs and accompanying text by Ostrovskaya.
Jews in the Ukraine: 1898–1994 Shtetls. Berlin: Hatje Cantz, 1996. . English-language version.
Juden in der Ukraine. Berlin: Hatje Cantz, 1996. . German-language version.

Collections
Ostrovskaya's work is held in the following permanent collection:
San Francisco Museum of Modern Art, San Francisco, CA: 4 prints (as of 19 March 2022)

Awards
1995: Albert Renger-Patzsch Award, Dietrich Oppenberg Foundation

References

External links
 (photography)
 (ceramics)

20th-century women photographers
21st-century women photographers
Documentary photographers
Ukrainian photographers
Ukrainian women photographers
Ukrainian journalists
Ukrainian women journalists
Living people
1953 births
Women photojournalists